Hellinsia praealtus is a moth of the family Pterophoridae. It is found in Guatemala.

The wingspan is 22‑24 mm. The forewings are white, much sprinkled with dark brown scales, which form a narrow and slightly diffused line along the costa, interrupted before and beyond by a broad costal patch at three‑fourths, produced obliquely inward to the base of the fissure and then diffused outwards to the tornus and termen. This is preceded by a dark spot on the middle of the cell, with another on the dorsum and little beyond it, and a costal spot before the apex is followed by another on the lower margin of the apical lobe. The hindwings are greyish brown. Adults are on wing in February and August.

References

Moths described in 1915
praealtus
Moths of the Caribbean
Moths of Central America